Thomas Clancy (born 13 February 1992) is an Irish Gaelic footballer who plays as a centre-back for the Cork senior team.

Born in Clonakilty, County Cork, Clancy first played competitive Gaelic football during his schooling at Clonakilty Community College. He arrived on the inter-county scene at the age of eighteen when he first linked up with the Cork minor team, before later joining the under-21 side. He made his senior debut during the 2013 championship. Since then Clancy has become a regular member of the starting fifteen.

At club level Clancy has won several championship medals with Clonakilty.

Honours

Team

Clonakilty Community College
All-Ireland Vocational Schools Senior A Football Championship (1): 2010
Munster Vocational Schools Senior Football Championship (1): 2010

Clonakilty
Cork Senior Football Championship (1): 2009 (sub)
West Cork Junior A Hurling Championship (1): 2012 2015

Cork
Munster Under-21 Football Championship (3): 2011, 2012, 2013
Munster Minor Football Championship (1): 2010

References

1992 births
Living people
Clonakilty Gaelic footballers
Clonakilty hurlers
Cork inter-county Gaelic footballers